The Dai Mirdad or Dai Mirdadi is a tribe of the Hazara people, living largely in Dara-i-Suf District, Samangan Province, Afghanistan.

See also 

 List of Hazara tribes
 Hazara people
 Dara-I-Suf District, Samangan

References 

Hazara people
Hazara tribes
Ethnic groups in Samangan Province